Square Enix is a Japanese video game developer and publisher formed from the merger on April 1, 2003 of video game developer Square and publisher Enix. The company is best known for its role-playing video game franchises, which include the Final Fantasy series, the Dragon Quest series, and the action-RPG Kingdom Hearts series. For many of its games, Square Enix has produced albums of music containing songs from those games or arrangements of those songs. In addition to those albums, it has produced several compilation albums containing music from multiple games or series made by the company. These albums include music directly from the games, as well as arrangements covering a variety of styles, such as orchestral, piano, vocal, and techno. This list includes albums produced by Square, Enix, or Square Enix which contain music from multiple games in the companies' catalog which are not a part of a single series. The first of these was Personal Computer Music by Enix in 1987. Dozens of albums have been published since, primarily through Square Enix's own record label.

Several of the albums have sold well, placing on the Japanese Oricon Albums Chart. Drammatica: The Very Best of Yoko Shimomura reached position 179, as did SQ Chips. SQ Chips 2 reached position 102, Love SQ reached 176, Chill SQ reached 236, Symphonic Fantasies reached 102, More SQ reached 107, Cafe SQ reached 134, Battle SQ reached 72, and Beer SQ reached position 81. The music on the compilation albums was originally composed by numerous composers. Among those well-represented are Nobuo Uematsu, long-time composer of the Final Fantasy series; Masashi Hamauzu, composer of various Final Fantasy, Chocobo, and SaGa games; Yasunori Mitsuda, composer for the Chrono series and Xenogears; Kenji Ito, who composed for several SaGa and Mana games, and Yoko Shimomura, composer for the Kingdom Hearts series.

Albums

References

Compilation albums
1980s compilation albums
1990s compilation albums
2000s compilation albums
2010s compilation albums
Compilation albums
Compilation albums
Video game music discographies
Lists of compilation albums